The 1935 South American Championships in Athletics  were held in Santiago, Chile, between 11 and 14 April.

Medal summary

Men's events

Medal table

External links
 Men Results – GBR Athletics
 Women Results – GBR Athletics

S
South American Championships in Athletics
International athletics competitions hosted by Chile
1935 in South American sport
1935 in Chilean sport